is a 2008 Japanese film directed by Yoshihiro Fukagawa and based on the novel of the same name by Keiko Kanome. The film stars Yūichi Nakamura as Jun Shibahara, Mirei Kiritani as Nozomi Hayakawa and Yūta Takahashi as Naoki Murai. The film was released on May 10, 2008. The movie also has a sister film premiered simultaneously titled Taiikukan Baby, which is composed of the same cast but with different plot and with BL themes.

Plot
Jun Shibahara is the best in the school's swimming team. One day, he passes out and in the hospital, he is diagnosed with hypertrophic cardiomyopathy, forcing him to retire from swimming. Jun loses all reason to exist and falls in depression. Suddenly though, he receives an email to his cellphone by someone else named Jun. They start emailing each other more and soon friendship becomes love. This makes Jun realize that swimming is not everything in life and they decide to go to the same university. However, happiness soon becomes tragedy.

Cast
Yūichi Nakamura as Jun Shibahara
Mirei Kiritani as Nozomi Hayakawa 
Yūta Takahashi as Naoki Murai
Shō Kubō as Shōichi Kato
Nanami Sakuraba as Yūki Hayakawa
Makoto Kawahara as Hikari Ijima 
Tomoya Nagai as Makoto Fujisawa
Ema Fujisawa as Michiru Yada
Mayuko Irie as Nozomi's Mother
Ikkei Watanabe as Yasushi Shibahara

References

External links

2008 films
Films set in Japan
2000s Japanese-language films
2008 romantic drama films
Japanese romantic drama films
2000s Japanese films